Povarovo is the name of several inhabited localities in Russia.

Urban localities
Povarovo, Moscow Oblast, a suburban (dacha) settlement in Solnechnogorsky District, Moscow Oblast

Rural localities
Povarovo, Pskov Oblast, a village in Krasnogorodsky District of Pskov Oblast
Povarovo, Vladimir Oblast, a village in Alexandrovsky District of Vladimir Oblast
Povarovo, Vologda Oblast, a village in Musorsky Selsoviet of Cherepovetsky District of Vologda Oblast